Thomas Rabe (born August 6, 1965, in Luxembourg) is a German business executive. In 2006, he was appointed to the Bertelsmann executive board, of which he has been chairman and chief executive officer since 2012. Under his leadership, the group has become more international, more digital and more diversified. In particular, he has advanced the business with music rights and the educational division. Additionally, Rabe was appointed chief executive officer of RTL Group in 2019.

Early life and education 
Rabe was born in 1965 in Luxembourg and grew up in Brussels, where his father worked as a civil servant in the European Coal and Steel Community from 1968. He attended the European School and as a youth was a bass player in a punk band. After completing his German baccalaureate (Abitur), Rabe studied Business and Economics at the RWTH Aachen and the University of Cologne. After earning a degree in business administration in 1989, he obtained his doctorate in economics, with a doctoral thesis on "Liberalization and Deregulation in the European Single Market for Insurance" in 1995.

In addition to his native language German, Rabe speaks English, French, Dutch and Spanish.

Career 
Rabe began his career at the European Commission in Brussels. At the Commission, from 1989 he worked in the Directorate-General for Financial Institutions and Corporate Law. One year later, he joined his supervisor in moving to the law firm Forrester, Norall & Sutton, which today belongs to White & Case. There he managed client accounts from the European Union, the United States and Japan. In 1991, Rabe was employed by the Treuhand agency in Berlin. In this capacity, among other responsibilities, he was in charge of the privatization of the assets of the Ministry for State Security and the National People's Army of the former GDR. In 1993, he was promoted to head of the Controlling Department. Subsequently, Rabe was involved as head of acquisitions at the Beteiligungsgesellschaft Neue Länder investment agency of the Association of German Banks (BdB), in investing DM 400 million in East German companies. After earning his Ph.D., in 1996 Rabe was hired as office head of the CEO of the Luxembourg financial service provider, Cedel International. He held additional positions there before being appointed chief financial officer in 1998. In subsequent years, he prepared the merger of Cedel International with Deutsche Börse Clearing into Clearstream.

In 2000, Rabe joined RTL Group as CFO. Here, he was additionally responsible for strategy and the Luxembourg television and radio business. Five years later, Bertelsmann brought him back to Gütersloh. Rabe was appointed as the group's CFO on January 1, 2006. At the same time, he was responsible for the Bertelsmann Music Group until 2008. Among other activities, Rabe also negotiated the buyback of shares from Groupe Bruxelles Lambert to prevent Bertelsmann from going public. In addition, the group established its own investment fund in Bertelsmann Digital Media Investments. Later, Rabe organized the return of Bertelsmann into the music business. His recruitment of Kohlberg Kravis Roberts & Co. as an investor in BMG Rights Management was seen as a key decision for the music company's future development.

Around 2009 Rabe was reportedly considered as future CEO of the ProSiebenSat.1 Media group and of the Franz Haniel & Cie. investment holding, but Rabe ultimately stayed with Bertelsmann.

CEO of Bertelsmann, 2012–present
After Hartmut Ostrowski announced his retirement as chairman and CEO in 2011, Rabe was declared his successor, effective January 1, 2012. With Rabe's appointment, Bertelsmann ushered in a strategy change towards stronger growth. Under his leadership, Bertelsmann experienced increased growth into Brazil, China, and India, and consolidated this development by bundling these activities in the Bertelsmann Investments division. Also, Rabe managed to complete the merger of Penguin Books with Random House to create the world's largest trade book publisher, and the purchase of the remaining shares in Gruner + Jahr. He built the education division into an additional pillar of the business, which today operates as the Bertelsmann Education Group. He consolidated the printing operations into the Bertelsmann Printing Group. Thus, by 2016, he had expanded the number of corporate divisions to eight.

Rabe's contract as chairman and CEO of Bertelsmann's executive board runs until 2021. As CEO of RTL Group, he oversees the company's TV unit; he is a member of the board of directors of Penguin Random House, among others.

Other activities 
 Corporate boards
 Adidas, Deputy Chairman of the Supervisory Board (since 2019)
 Penguin Random House, Chairman of the Supervisory Board (since 2018)
 Gruner + Jahr, Member of the Supervisory Board (since 2012)
 RTL Group, Chief Executive Officer (since 2019) and Member of the Board of Directors (since 2012)
 Symrise (2011–2019), Chairman of the Supervisory Board
 Springer Science+Business Media, Member of Supervisory Board (since 2010)

 Non-profit boards
 Federation of German Industries (BDI), Member of the Presidium (2017-2018)
 Baden-Badener Unternehmer-Gespräche (BBUG), Member of the Board of Trustees

Personal life 
Rabe lives in Gütersloh and Berlin and is married to a neurologist. The couple collects modern art and, in 2015, purchased a Henry van de Velde-designed villa in Tervuren near Brussels.

Rabe is a member of the Catholic fraternity AV Hansea-Berlin zu Köln.

References

External links 

 Curriculum Vitae of Thomas Rabe on the official Bertelsmann website
 Thomas Rabe, Bertelsmann CEO: From punk rock to family values (Financial Times)

1965 births
Living people
Bertelsmann
Luxembourgian emigrants to Germany
German chief executives
RTL Group people
RWTH Aachen University alumni